Akure Township Stadium is a multi-use stadium in Akure, Nigeria.  It is currently used mostly for football matches and is the home stadium of Sunshine Stars F.C. of the Nigerian Premier League. The stadium has a capacity of 3,000 spectators.

Ahead of the 2020/21 Nigeria Professional Football League (NPFL) season, and as part of the broader club licensing regime, 13 stadiums across the country have been certified by the League Management Company (LMC) to have met minimum requirements to host games. Akure Township Stadium among others is listed as requiring repairs varying from relaying of new synthetic grass, regressing, provision of floodlights, television camera platforms and upgrade of changing rooms as well as provision of additional exit and entry gates among others basic requirements. Others include Sani Abacha Stadium, Kano, Agege Stadium, Warri Township Stadium, New Jos Township Stadium and Nnamdi Azikiwe Stadium, Enugu.

References

External links
 Stadium information

Football venues in Nigeria
Akure